The 4th arrondissement of Paris (IVe arrondissement) is one of the twenty arrondissements of the capital city of France. In spoken French, this arrondissement is referred to as quatrième. Along with the 1st, 2nd and 3rd arrondissements, it is in the first sector of Paris, which maintains a single local government rather than four separate ones.

The arrondissement, also known as Hôtel-de-Ville, is situated on the right bank of the River Seine. It contains the Renaissance-era Paris City Hall, rebuilt between 1874 and 1882. It also contains the Renaissance square of Place des Vosges, the overtly modern Pompidou Centre, and the lively southern part of the medieval district of Le Marais, which today is known for being the gay district of Paris. (The quieter northern part of Le Marais is within the 3rd arrondissement). The eastern part of the Île de la Cité (including Notre-Dame de Paris) and all of the Île Saint-Louis are also included within the 4th arrondissement.

The 4th arrondissement is known for its little streets, cafés, and shops but is often regarded by Parisians as expensive and congested. It has old buildings and a mix of many cultures.

Geography
With a land area of 1.601 km2 (0.618 sq.miles, or 396 acres), the 4th arrondissement is the third smallest arrondissement in the city.

It is bordered to the west by the 1st arrondissement, to the north by the 3rd, to the east by the 11th and 12th, and to the south by the Seine and the 5th.

Demographics

The peak of population of the 4th arrondissement occurred before 1861, though the arrondissement was defined in its current shape only since the re-organization of Paris in 1860. In 1999, the population was 30,675, and the arrondissement hosted 41,424 jobs.

Historical population

¹

Immigration

History

The Île de la Cité has been inhabited since the 1st century BC, when it was occupied by the Parisii tribe of the Gauls. The Right Bank was first settled in the 5th century.

Since the end of the 19th century, le Marais has been populated by a significant Jewish population, the Rue des Rosiers being at the heart of its community. There are a handful of kosher restaurants, and Jewish institutions. Since the 1990s, gay culture has influenced the arrondissement, with new residents opening a number of bars and cafés in the area by the town hall.

Map

Cityscape

Places of interest in the arrondissement

 Bazar de l'Hôtel de Ville department store
 Berthillon
 Bibliothèque de l'Arsenal
 Centre Georges Pompidou
 Hôtel-Dieu hospital
 Hôtel de Sens
 Hôtel de Sully, on the site of a former orangery
 Hôtel de Ville
 Le Marais
 Rue des Rosiers
 Lycée Charlemagne
 Maison européenne de la photographie
 Marché aux fleurs, Place Louis Lépine
 Mémorial de la Shoah
 Musée Boleslas Biegas, Musée Adam Mickiewicz, and Salon Frédéric Chopin
 Musée de la Magie
 Notre-Dame de Paris
 Pavillon de l'Arsenal
 Prefecture of Police
 Quai des Célestins
 Saint-Jacques Tower
 St-Gervais-et-St-Protais Church
 Saint-Louis-en-l'Île Church
 Salle des Traditions de la Garde Républicaine
 Former Temple, fortress and later prison
 Temple du Marais
 Église Saint-Merri

Main streets and squares
 Place de la Bastille (shared with the 11th and 12th arrondissements), including the July Column (Colonne de juillet)
 Place de l'Hôtel de Ville, formerly Place de Grève
 Place des Vosges (shared with the 3rd arrondissement)
 Place du Châtelet (shared with the 1st arrondissement)
 Place Saint-Gervais, outside the doors of the St-Gervais-et-St-Protais Church
 Rue de Rivoli (shared with the 1st arrondissement)
 Square Barye

Education
Lycée Charlemagne is located in the arrondissement, as well as Haredi Jewish institutions Yad Mordekhai.

Transport
Metro stations within, partially or fully, the 4th arrondissement:
 Bastille
 Châtelet
 Cité
 Hôtel de Ville
 Pont Marie
 Rambuteau
 Saint-Paul
 Sully – Morland

References

External links

 The official guide, partner of the Paris Tourist office 

Site of the Mayor of the 4th arrondissement (in French)
 L'Indépendant du 4e Posts in English by an inhabitants of the 4th arrondissement since 2008 : dailylife, history, heritage,...
 News on Marais in Paris